The 84th (York and Lancaster) Regiment of Foot was a regiment in the British Army, raised in 1793. Under the Childers Reforms it amalgamated with the 65th (2nd Yorkshire, North Riding) Regiment of Foot to form the York and Lancaster Regiment, with the 84th becoming the 2nd Battalion, in 1881.

History

Formation
The regiment was raised at York by Lieutenant Colonel George Bernard as the 	84th Regiment of Foot, in response to the threat posed by the French Revolution, on 2 November 1793. A short-lived 2nd Battalion was raised in March 1794. The 1st Battalion was sent to join the Duke of York's army in the Netherlands in September 1794 as part of the unsuccessful defence of that country against the Republican French during the Flanders Campaign. Returning to Britain in the spring of 1795, both battalions of the 84th were posted to the Cape of Good Hope in 1795 where they were amalgamated. From South Africa, the regiment was sent to Madras in India in 1798 and on to Bombay in February 1799.

Napoleonic Wars

A second battalion was raised again in May 1808 and the regiment became the 84th (York and Lancaster) Regiment of Foot (reflecting the fact that the 1st Battalion had been raised in Yorkshire and the 2nd Battalion had been raised in Lancashire) in January 1809. The 1st Battalion was sent to the French held island of Mauritius in the Indian Ocean where they participated in the capture of the island in 1810. After this the battalion served in Bangalore for the next four years. From there they were involved in the recapturing of Kurnool in 1815 and against the Mahratta princes in the last stages of the Third Anglo-Maratha War. The battalion returned to England in 1819 where it absorbed the 2nd Battalion.

Meanwhile, the 2nd Battalion took part in the disastrous Walcheren Campaign in autumn 1809. The battalion embarked for Portugal for service in the Peninsular War in August 1813. Pursuing the French Army into France, it saw action at the Battle of the Bidassoa on October 1813, the Battle of Nivelle in November 1813 and the Battle of the Nive in December 1813. The battalion returned to England, where it was absorbed by the 1st Battalion in 1819.

The Victorian era

Detachments boarded HMS Dromedary and HMS Coromandel as escorts for convicts bound for Van Diemen's Land and New South Wales in 1820. Both ships continued to New Zealand to harvest kauri trees for use as spars for first rate (98 gun) Royal Navy warships. Two officers and a detachment of the regiment remained on HMS Dromedary for the eleven month expedition to the Bay of Islands and Whangaroa. The battalion was sent to Jamaica, where it helped quell the slave riots, in 1827. The regiment remained in the West Indies until 1839 when it returned home.

The regiment was sent to Burma in 1842 and to India in 1845. The regiment was involved in the Siege of Cawnpore and the Relief of Lucknow during the Indian Rebellion. General James Outram wrote of the regiment:

After Cawnpore and Lucknow were recaptured the regiment was involved in the protection of the countryside under Brigadier John Douglas who wrote:

The regiment was the only formation ever to receive a salute from the battery at Fort William, Calcutta and received that acclaim when it left India in 1859. It was deployed to Malta in 1865 and to Jamaica in 1867 before going on to Halifax, Nova Scotia in 1870. It returned home in 1871.

As part of the Cardwell Reforms of the 1870s, where single-battalion regiments were linked together to share a single depot and recruiting district in the United Kingdom, the 84th was linked with the 65th (2nd Yorkshire, North Riding) Regiment of Foot, and assigned to district no. 7 at Pontefract Barracks in Yorkshire. On 1 July 1881 the Childers Reforms came into effect and the regiment amalgamated with the 65th (2nd Yorkshire, North Riding) Regiment of Foot to form the York and Lancaster Regiment, with the 84th becoming the 2nd Battalion.

Victoria Crosses 
The 84th Foot had six Victoria Crosses awarded to men serving in its ranks all won during the Indian Mutiny :
Captain Augustus Anson
Lance-corporal Abraham Boulger
Private Joel Holmes
Sergeant-major George Lambert
Private Patrick Mylott
Corporal John Sinnott

Battle honours 
Battle honours won by the regiment were:

Peninsular War: Nive, Peninsula
 India, Lucknow

Colonels of the Regiment 
Colonels of the Regiment were:

84th Regiment of Foot
1794–1820: Gen. George Bernard

84th (York and Lancaster) Regiment of Foot - (1809)
1820–1822: Gen. Sir George Townsend Walker, Bt, GCB
1822–1823: Maj-Gen. Sir Denis Pack, KCB
1823–1840: Gen. Sir Fitzroy Jeffries Grafton Maclean, Bt
1840–1854: Gen. Sir Loftus William Otway, CB
1854–1868: Gen. Sir George Augustus Wetherall, GCB, KH
1868–1872: Gen. Thomas Wood
1872–1881: Gen. Sir David Russell, KCB

References

Sources

Further reading

External links

Infantry regiments of the British Army
Regiments of Yorkshire
York and Lancaster Regiment
Military units and formations established in 1793
Military units and formations disestablished in 1881
1793 establishments in Great Britain
1881 disestablishments in the United Kingdom